Robson Moura Fonseca is a Brazilian Jiu Jitsu competitor, instructor and a mixed martial artist. He started training in Brazilian Jiu Jitsu at the age of 10 in Teresópolis, Brazil. His first Brazilian Jiu-Jitsu teacher was Ailson "Jucão" Brites, though Moura attained the rank of black belt at the age of 16 from Nova União co-founder André Pederneiras. Today Moura holds a 6th degree black belt in Brazilian Jiu-Jitsu under Professor Brites. He has a mixed martial arts record of 2-1-1.

Moura is known for his innovative style and ever-evolving technique in the world of jiu-jitsu. He won his division in the BJJ Mundials from 1996 through 2000, and again in 2007. He is recognized by the IBJJF, CBJJF & CBJJO. Having established and taught at academies in Brazil, he runs his Robson Moura Brazilian Jiu Jitsu Academy in Tampa, Florida.

In addition to his position as Head Instructor at RMNU Headquarters in Tampa, Florida, Moura directs additional academies in Brazil that are run by his black belt instructors. Moura travels frequently across the country sharing his knowledge and experience with other jiu jitsu players. In 2008, he established the Robson Moura Association, with over 45 affiliates around the world. He continues to compete, recently winning his division at the Rickson Gracie Invitational, and competing at Polaris and the Abu Dhabi World Pro in 2016.

Professional grappling career
Moura competed at Polaris 21 on September 21, 2022 in a gi superfight against Tom Barlow. Moura won the match by unanimous decision.

Mixed martial arts record

|-
| Draw
| align=center| 2-1-1
| Mamoru Yamaguchi
| Draw
| Shooto: 9/26 in Kourakuen Hall
| 
| align=center| 3
| align=center| 5:00
| Tokyo, Japan
| 
|-
| Win
| align=center| 2-1
| Junji Ikoma
| Decision (unanimous) 
| Shooto - Year End Show 2003 
| 
| align=center| 3
| align=center| 5:00
| Tokyo, Japan
| 
|-
| Loss
| align=center| 1-1
| Yasuhiro Urushitani
| Decision (split)
| Shooto - 5/4 in Korakuen Hall
| 
| align=center| 3
| align=center| 5:00
| Tokyo, Japan
| 
|-
| Win
| align=center| 1-0
| Mamoru Yamaguchi
| Decision (unanimous)
| Shooto: Treasure Hunt 10
| 
| align=center| 3
| align=center| 5:00
| Tokyo, Japan
|

See also
List of Brazilian Jiu-Jitsu practitioners

References

External links

Robson Moura Website
Robson Moura Interview
Robson Moura on BJJ Heroes

Brazilian male mixed martial artists
Brazilian practitioners of Brazilian jiu-jitsu
Flyweight mixed martial artists
Mixed martial artists utilizing Brazilian jiu-jitsu
People from Teresópolis
Living people
1978 births
People awarded a black belt in Brazilian jiu-jitsu
World Brazilian Jiu-Jitsu Championship medalists
IBJJF Hall of Fame inductees
Sportspeople from Rio de Janeiro (state)